Křimov is a municipality and village in Chomutov District in the Ústí nad Labem Region of the Czech Republic. It has about 400 inhabitants.

Administrative parts
Villages and hamlets of Celná, Domina, Krásná Lípa, Menhartice, Nebovazy, Stráž, Strážky and Suchdol are administrative parts of Křimov.

References

Villages in Chomutov District